Vascular endothelial growth factor A (VEGF-A) is a protein that in humans is encoded by the VEGFA gene.

Function 

This gene is a member of the platelet-derived growth factor (PDGF)/vascular endothelial growth factor (VEGF) family and encodes a protein that is often found as a disulfide linked homodimer. This protein is a glycosylated mitogen that specifically acts on endothelial cells and has various effects, including mediating increased vascular permeability, inducing angiogenesis, vasculogenesis and endothelial cell growth, promoting cell migration, and inhibiting apoptosis. Alternatively spliced transcript variants, encoding either freely secreted or cell-associated isoforms, have been characterized.

VEGF-A shows prominent activity with vascular endothelial cells, primarily through its interactions with the VEGFR1 and -R2 receptors found in prominently on the endothelial cell membrane. Although, it does have effects on a number of other cell types (e.g., stimulation monocyte/macrophage migration, neurons, cancer cells, kidney epithelial cells ). In vitro, VEGF-A has been shown to stimulate endothelial cell mitogenesis and cell migration. VEGF-A is also a vasodilator and increases microvascular permeability and was originally referred to as vascular permeability factor.

During embryonic development angiogenesis is initiated as mesoderm mesenchyme cells are specified to differentiate into angioblasts, expressing the Vascular Endothelial Growth Factor Receptor (VEGFR-2). As embryonic tissue utilizes more oxygen than it receives from diffusion, it becomes hypoxic. These cells will secrete the signaling molecule vascular endothelial factor A (VEGFA) which will recruit the angioblasts expressing its partnering receptor to the site of future angiogenesis. The angioblasts will create scaffolding structures that form the primary capillary plexus from where the local vasculature system will develop.  
Disruption of this gene in mice resulted in abnormal embryonic blood vessel formation, resulting in underdeveloped vascular structures. This gene is also upregulated in many tumors and its expression is correlated with tumor development and is a target in many developing cancer therapeutics. Elevated levels of this protein are found in patients with POEMS syndrome, also known as Crow-Fukase syndrome which is a hemangioblastic proliferative disorder. Allelic variants of this gene have been associated with microvascular complications of diabetes 1 and atherosclerosis.

VEGF-A Overview 
Vascular endothelial growth factor A (VEGF-A) is a dimeric glycoprotein that plays a significant role in neurons and is considered to be the main, dominant inducer to the growth of blood vessels. VEGFA is essential for adults during organ remodeling and diseases that involve blood vessels, for example, in wound healing, tumor angiogenesis, diabetic retinopathy, and age-related macular degeneration. During early vertebrate development, vasculogenesis occurs which means that the endothelial condense into the blood vessels. The differentiation of endothelial cells is dependent upon the expression of VEGFA and if the expression is abolished then it can result in the death of the embryo. VEGFA is produced by a group of three major isoforms as a result of alternative splicing and if any three isoforms are produced (VEGFA120, VEGFA164, and VEGFA188) then this will not result in vessel defects and death of the full VEGFA knockout in mice. VEGFA is essential in the role of neurons because they too need vascular supply and abolishing the expression of VEGFA from neural progenitors will result in defects of the brain vascularization and neuronal apoptosis. Anti-VEGFA therapy can be used to treat patients with undesirable angiogenesis and vascular leakage in cancer and eye diseases but also could result in the inhibition of neurogenesis and neuroprotection. VEGFA could be used to treat patients with neurodegenerative and neuropathic conditions and also increase vascular permeability which will stop the blood-brain barrier and increase inflammatory cell infiltration.

Usage 
 Angiogenesis
 ↑ Migration of endothelial cells
 ↑ mitosis of endothelial cells
 ↑ Matrix metalloproteinase activity
 ↑ αvβ3 activity
 creation of blood vessel lumen
 creates lumen
 creates fenestrations
Chemotactic for macrophages and granulocytes
 Vasodilation (indirectly by NO release)

Also tumour suppression.

Clinical significance 

Elevated levels of this protein is linked to POEMS syndrome, also known as Crow-Fukase syndrome. Mutations in this gene have been associated with proliferative and nonproliferative diabetic retinopathy.

Treatment of ischemic heart disease 

In ischemic cardiomyopathy, blood flow to the muscle cells of the heart is either partially or completely reduced, leading to cell death and scar tissue formation. Because the muscle cells are replaced with fibrous tissue, the heart loses its ability to contract, compromising heart function. Normally, if blood flow to the heart is compromised, over time, new blood vessels will develop, providing alternative circulation to the affected cells. The viability of the heart following severely restricted blood flow is dependent on the ability of the heart to provide this collateral circulation. Expression of VEGF-A has been found to be induced by myocardial ischemia and a higher level of expression of VEGF-A has been associated with better collateral circulation development during ischemia.

VEGF-A activation 

When cells are deprived of oxygen, they increase their production of VEGF-A. VEGF-A mediates the growth of new blood vessels from pre-existing vessels (angiogenesis) by binding to the cell surface receptors VEGFR1 and VEGFR2, two tyrosine kinases located in endothelial cells of the cardiovascular system. These two receptors act through different pathways to contribute to endothelial cell proliferation and migration, and formation of tubular structures.

VEGFR2 

The binding of VEGF-A to VEGFR2 causes two VEGFR2 molecules to combine to form a dimer. Following this dimerization, through the action of the receptor itself, a phosphate group is added to certain tyrosines within the molecule in a process called auto-phosphorylation. The autophosphorylation of these amino acids allows for signalling molecules within to the cell to bind to the receptor and become activated. These signalling molecules include VEGF-receptor activated protein (VRAP), PLC- γ and Nck.

Each of these is important in the signalling required for angiogenesis. VRAP (also known as T-cell specific adaptor) and Nck signalling are important in reorganization of the structural components of the cell, allowing for cells to move around to areas where they are needed. PLC- γ is vital to the proliferative effects of VEGF-A signalling. Activation of the phospholipase PLC- γ results in an increase in calcium levels in the cell, leading to the activation of protein kinase C (PKC). PKC phosphorylates the mitogen-activated protein kinase (MAPK) ERK which then moves to the nucleus of the cell and takes part in nuclear signalling. Once in the nucleus, ERK activates various transcription factors which initiate expression of genes involved in cellular proliferation. Activation of a different MAPK (p38 MAPK) by VEGFR2 is important in the transcription of genes associated with cellular migration.

VEGFR1 

The tyrosine kinase activity of VEGFR1 is less efficient than that of VEGFR2 and its activation alone is insufficient to bring about the proliferative effects of VEGF-A. The major role of VEGFR1 is to recruit the cells responsible in blood cell development.

Current research 

It has been shown that injection of VEGF-A in dogs following severely restricted blood flow to the heart caused an increase in collateral blood vessel formation compared to the dogs who did not receive the VEGF-A treatment. It was also shown in dogs that delivery of VEGF-A to areas of the heart with little or no blood flow enhanced collateral blood vessel formation and increased the viability of the cells in that area. In gene therapy, DNA which encodes the gene of interest is integrated into a vector along with elements that are able to promote the gene's expression. The vector is then injected either into muscle cells of the heart or the blood vessels supplying the heart. The natural machinery of the cell is then used to express these genes. Currently, human clinical trials are being conducted to study the effectiveness of gene therapy with VEGF-A in restoring blood flow and function to areas of the heart that have severely restricted blood flow. So far, this type of therapy has proven both safe and beneficial.

Interactions
Vascular endothelial growth factor A has been shown to interact with:
 ADAMTS1,
 CTGF, and
 NRP1,

See also
Vascular endothelial growth factor
Bevacizumab (or Avastin) anti VEGF-A human antibody drug.

References

External links 
 

Genes associated with cancer